Daniel Alejandro López Cassaccia (born July 3, 1989) is a retired tennis player from Paraguay. He played on the Paraguay Davis Cup team.  Alongside Matteo Trevisan he won the 2007 Wimbledon Championships – Boys' doubles title.

ATP Challenger and ITF Futures finals

Singles: 4 (0–4)

Doubles: 14 (6–8)

Junior Grand Slam finals

Doubles: 1 (1 title)

References

External links

1989 births
Living people
Paraguayan male tennis players
Wimbledon junior champions
Tennis players at the 2011 Pan American Games
Pan American Games competitors for Paraguay
Grand Slam (tennis) champions in boys' doubles
20th-century Paraguayan people
21st-century Paraguayan people